Chastity belts are a type of chastity device used in BDSM as part of the practice of orgasm denial, to prevent the wearer from engaging in certain types of sexual activity without the permission of the dominant, who acts as "keyholder". Chastity belts prevent sexual intercourse, masturbation and oral sex involving the wearer's genitals. There are designs suitable for both men and women. Chastity belts may be worn during a session of BDSM play, for a limited period or as a long-term arrangement. Users who choose to wear a chastity device often have a chastity fetish, and therefore enjoy the experience of being in chastity.

Purpose 
The wearer of the belt is regarded as the submissive in a BDSM relationship. This is a part of the wider practice of orgasm denial. Some say that it increases submissiveness in men. It has often been reported that when worn, the chastity belt frequently evokes sexual frustration in the wearer.

The putting on of a chastity belt, by a partner, is an indication of the dominance by the "keyholder" over the wearer's sexual activities. By accepting the chastity belt the wearer accepts surrender of control over their sexual behavior to a partner, who may grant permission to the wearer to engage in sexual activity by removing the belt. The dominant may decide when, where, how, how often, and even if, the submissive is allowed sexual release. 

In a dynamic between a female dominant and male submissive, the Femdom may wear the chastity key on a necklace as a symbol of her domination over her submissive. She may delay his gratification, play games centered on tease and denial, or give him ruined orgasms while he wears the chastity cage. Social media may be incorporated into the erotic games, for instance by using social media to ask to vote how much longer the submissive must remain in chastity.  The loss of control over his sexual responses may arouse him and or give him mental pleasure. 

Most modern belt designs cannot prevent wearers from physically touching their genitals but they do usually prevent masturbation. Penis cages (see below) may hold the penis firmly but they may also be loose and, although intercourse is rendered impossible, they may make manual stimulation, even to orgasm, a possibility. The most effective masturbation prevention requires design features that incorporate genital piercings or full tight encapsulation of the genital area. 

There are many online forums for users to discuss their experience of staying in chastity.

Female chastity belts 

Modern chastity belts for women generally follow the traditional "Florentine" pattern (named after the historical reference to chastity belts in Florence in the 15th century military manual Bellifortis), with a band around the waist or hips and a "shield" that runs between the legs to cover the genitals.

Modern belts usually are made with features and accessories to accommodate erotic fantasy and BDSM play. For example, a slot in the shield may hold a dildo inside the wearer's vagina, which cannot be removed except by the keyholder. Some have a perforated cover (sometimes called the "secondary shield") over this slot to prevent the wearer from being pinched when sitting. The cover may also prevent direct masturbation by preventing access to the labia. Anal shields which forcibly retain butt plugs inside the wearer are a common accessory. The shield can be designed to work with genital piercings for greater security.

Some female chastity devices are not practical for long term wear due to sanitary constraints. On belts intended for long-term wear, the shield must accommodate the wearer's hygienic needs:
 The shield is commonly a flat band with a slot through which the labia can protrude to breathe and through which urine can pass.
 Belts with a "thong" arrangement have a single strap running up between the buttocks to the waistband. This may be a plastic-coated cable or a thin, curved metal rod, and there may be an opening in the thong to allow defecation.
 Belts with a "V"-arrangement have a pair of chains or cables attached together at the bottom of the shield and apart towards the back of waistband in a "V" to leave the rear open.

Male chastity belts 
Chastity belts of the so-called Florentine type also exist for men.  As in the standard Florentine design, a circular horizontal band encircles the waist and a shield is attached to the front of the waist belt.  The shield extends downwards to cover the genital areas of the wearer and is attached to the back of the waist belt.  For male belts, a penis tube is secured behind the front shield.  In some designs, the testicles are covered by special cages.  Most high-security chastity belts are made out of stainless steel, although fiberglass composite belts have also been made.  Most belt designs are secured with padlocks.  For travel a plastic device with a numbered plastic seal. The more secure designs have their padlocks' shackles hidden to make cutting the shackle difficult.

Male chastity cages 
A popular type of chastity device for men is commonly referred to as a chastity cage, penis cage, or chastity tube. They are almost exclusively used as a sex toy and in BDSM play, and may enclose a man's penis in order to make an erection uncomfortable or impossible if the man becomes sexually aroused, and prevent sexual intercourse, masturbation, oral sex involving the wearer's genitals and some other forms of sexual activity. A chastity cage may be combined with toys such as a shock collar or ball crusher.

Most chastity cages consist of a ring seated around the base of the penis behind the scrotum and a tube or penis cage that holds the penis, with the two parts mating together with a hinge or pin. The penis cage is designed so that the penis inside cannot be stimulated directly with hands and fingers.  The tip of the penis cage is perforated to allow urine to pass and the design may incorporate vents to facilitate long-term wearing and cleaning. The flaccid penis is inserted into the cage and is held at a downwards angle so as to make an erection uncomfortable or impossible. Some designs have an extra short penis cage into which the penis may be squeezed to restrict it even more than in a regular penis cage. Other designs incorporate a tip covering the glans through which a catheter is fixed, and the tip is then secured by short straps which confine the penis and are fixed to the ring seated behind the scrotum.

The ring and cage are usually secured together with a lock or with a tamper-evident plastic security seal.  When the device is locked, the testicles are trapped in the gap between the ring and the penis cage which is narrow enough to prevent the testicles and penis from being pulled out. The testicles are usually held in a fixed position, exposed beneath the cage although some designs have an additional cup that prevents easy access to the entire genital area.

Chastity cages can be manufactured out of a strong plastic material such as polycarbonate, ABS, or they may be made from silicone which greatly reduces their cost and weight compared with stainless steel versions. New information implies that caution should be taken before using a device made from BPA containing plastics such as polycarbonate. A device made from ABS plastic is a safer alternative to polycarbonate plastic due to polycarbonate leaching BPA through long term contact with the skin. BPA can cause an estrogen response in men leading to hormone imbalances and possible shrinkage of the penis through the leaching of endocrine disrupting chemicals directly through the skin.

Most chastity cages are intended for long-term or indefinite wear and may include a lock with keys retained by a key-holder, or a plastic locking device which incorporates an identity number so that the wearer may be locked by a remote key-holder. When combined with such a tamper-evident plastic seal, plastic chastity cages permit easier access through airport security or other security restricted areas that require passage through metal detectors.

There are remote controlled chastity cages which can be controlled by a keyholder via smartphone app. Most notable is Cellmate, a bluetooth enabled chastity cage designed by Qiui. When locked, the cage is held closed by a locking pin. In normal operation, the locking pin can only be released by a small electric motor that is controlled by an onboard micro-controller. It has received scrutiny for a security flaw in the API which could cause it to be hacked.

Safety 
A chastity cage must be properly sized, fitted and adjusted in order to be secure and not damage the genitals. Ring size and spacing are the two most important adjustments that can be made. A ring that is too tight will cut off blood flow while one that is too loose will not be secure. Metal chastity belts and chastity cages intended for long term wear should be made out of medical grade stainless steel or titanium, to reduce the risks of metal allergies and metal toxicity.

Penile strangulation, as a result of not being able to remove a device placed around the penis (not necessarily a chastity belt), has occurred in a wide spectrum of age groups, so care must be taken to avoid constriction with a chastity belt. In 2008, an incident was reported of a man having to be cut free from a titanium chastity device after losing the keys, due to pressure on the genitals. 

One of the most common misconceptions is that chastity cages prevent erections from occurring.  While they do control erections, they do not prevent them as this would require dangerously cutting off the blood flow to the penis.

Manufacture 
Most modern chastity belt designs are descended from Hal Higginbottom's designs from 1956. Sometimes modern Florentine-style belts are described as "Tollyboy-style" or "Tollyboy-type" belts as references to his company's original design.

Human anatomy varies very widely from person to person and steel belts intended for long-term use are bespoke (custom-made) items. The manufacture of such belts, being quite a specific niche, is necessarily a cottage industry. Many firms have come and gone over the years.

In 1969, Time magazine and various newspapers in 1978 ran stories about David Renwick, a British chastity belt maker who claimed to have a thriving business making belts for a worldwide clientele.

In 1971, the Hugessen firm of Halstead, Essex, that made chastity belts, applied for tax exempt status on the basis that their products were birth control devices. In 1974, a story was widely published in magazines and newspapers about the firm's bankruptcy.

A.L. Enterprises, of Las Vegas, Nevada, USA, that sells the CB series of plastic chastity cages, was started by Doris and Frank Miller in the 2000. Doris and Frank Miller are considered pioneers in the modern chastity belt. They died in 2017. The company they founded was sold to investors in 2018. World Cage male chastity was founded in 2020 by the Miller's daughter Nikki Yates, the former CEO of A.L. Enterprises from 2007-2017.

Although no reliable statistics are available on the use of chastity belts, anecdotal reports from manufacturers suggest that most belts sold in Europe and the U.S. are for men, and that of the female belts ordered, relatively few are used as rape prevention devices.

Erotica 
Chastity belts have made appearances in erotica. Esar Levine's 1931 Chastity Belts: An Illustrated History of the Bridling of Women compiled erotica of women in chastity belts, with commentary. Contemporary websites such as Literotica and SmutMD have hundreds of eroticas written by amateur writers about both male and female chastity.

See also 

Chastity piercing
Cock and ball torture
Cuckold fetishism
Feminization 
Erotic sexual denial

References 

Physical restraint
BDSM equipment